Eswatini competed at the 2018 Summer Youth Olympics in Buenos Aires, Argentina from 6 October to 18 October 2018.

Competitors

Athletics

Boys

Girls

Swimming

Girls

References

2018 in Swazi sport
Nations at the 2018 Summer Youth Olympics
Eswatini at the Youth Olympics